Brach may refer to:

People
 Brad Brach, American baseball player
 Emil J. Brach (1859 1947) American businessman
 François-Louis de Brach, French Navy officer
 Gérard Brach (1927–2006), French screenwriter
 Helen Brach (1911 1977)
 Jean François Louis de Brach (1668–1739), French naval officer
 Julius Brach (1881–1938), Czech chess master
 Paul Brach, (1924–2007), American abstract painter
 Philippe Brach, stage name of Philippe Bouchard (born 1989), Canadian singer-songwriter
 Tara Brach (born 1953), American psychologist and author

Places
 Brach, Gironde, France

Other
 Brach's, American confectionery manufacturer
 Hohe Brach a mountain in Germany

See also
 Brač, Croatia
 Broch